The Afghanistan national under-17 football team  is controlled by the Afghanistan Football Federation and represents Afghanistan in international under-17 football competitions. The team properly qualified for the 2012 AFC U-16 Championship, but were disqualified from the tournament for fielding an ineligible player in the 2012 AFC U-16 Championship qualification tournament.

Competitive record

FIFA U-17 World Cup record

AFC U-17 Asian Cup record

See also
Afghanistan national football team
Afghanistan Football Federation
Football in Afghanistan
Sport in Afghanistan
Afghanistan

References

External links
 Afghanistan Football Federation  

Asian national under-17 association football teams
under-17
Youth football in Afghanistan